Robert Rollo Jack (4 April 1902 – 1994) was a footballer who played primarily as an inside right in the Football League in the 1920s and 1930s.

He was the brother of David, the England international footballer, whilst his father Bob was also a professional footballer and manager.

Rollo started as a trainee with Plymouth Argyle, making his debut on 23 December 1922 against Watford, before moving north to join Bolton Wanderers for £1500, where his brother was playing. He made his debut for Bolton on 22 December 1923 against Notts County. However, in six seasons with Bolton he only made 29 League appearances. He then moved to Clapton Orient in  September 1929 for £1000 and he played regularly for them over the next three seasons. Rollo then moved into non-league football with Yeovil and Petters United of the Southern Football League, before a transfer back to the Football League with Swindon Town for the 1934–35 season, and he made 20 league appearances for Swindon, scoring on two occasions.

References

1902 births
1994 deaths
Footballers from Bolton
English Football League players
Plymouth Argyle F.C. players
Bolton Wanderers F.C. players
Leyton Orient F.C. players
Yeovil Town F.C. players
Swindon Town F.C. players
Association football forwards
English footballers
English people of Scottish descent